The 1949 World Fencing Championships were held in Cairo, Egypt.

Medal table

Medal summary

Men's events

Women's events

References

1949 in Egyptian sport
1949 in fencing
F
Sports competitions in Cairo
World Fencing Championships
1940s in Cairo